This is a list of notable persons who have been members of the United States Peace Corps, along with their terms of service. The Peace Corps volunteers category page may include a more extensive list of individuals.

Business 

 Patricia Cloherty, Chairman and CEO, Delta Private Equity Partners, former Chairman of The U.S. Russia Investment Fund, Deputy Administration for the U.S. Small Business Administration (Brazil 1963-65)
 Reed Hastings, founder and CEO of Netflix (Swaziland 1983–85)
 Michael McCaskey, chairman of the board, Chicago Bears (Ethiopia 1965–67)
 Bob Haas, Chairman Emeritus of Levi Strauss & Co., son of Walter A. Haas Jr., and the great-great-grandnephew of the company's founder, Levi Strauss (Ivory Coast 1964–66) 
 Alberto Ibargüen, President and CEO of the John S. and James L. Knight Foundation  (Venezuela, 1966–68)
 Christopher Hedrick, former CEO NextStep, former CEO of Intrepid Learning and Kepler and country director of Peace Corps Senegal (Senegal, 1988-90)

Journalists 
 T. D. Allman, journalist/author (Vanity Fair; New Yorker; NYT) (Nepal, 1966–68)
 Peter Hessler, author of River Town: Two Years on the Yangtze; Oracle Bones; Country Driving. Staff writer, New Yorker (China 1996–97)
 Roger K. Lewis, Washington Post columnist, architect, author, cartoonist (Tunisia, 1964–66)
 Maureen Orth, journalist, author, and a Special Correspondent for Vanity Fair magazine  (Colombia, 1964–66)
 George Packer, journalist, novelist, and playwright. He is best known for his writings for The New Yorker about U.S. foreign policy and for his book The Assassins' Gate: America in Iraq (Togo 1982–1983)
 Ben Bradlee Jr.,  journalist and writer. He was a reporter and editor at The Boston Globe for 25 years (Afghanistan 1970–1972)
 Tony D'Souza, novelist, journalist, essayist, reviewer, travel and short story writer (India 1966-1968, Côte d'Ivoire 2001–2002)
 Leon Dash, Pulitzer Prize winning reporter for the Washington Post (Kenya 1969–1970)
 Arnold Hano,  editor, novelist, biographer and journalist, best known for his non-fiction work, A Day in the Bleachers, frequent contributor to such publications as The New York Times, Sport, Sports Illustrated, and TV Guide (Costa Rica 1991–1993)
 Laurence Leamer, associate editor at Newsweek anc contributor to Harper's, The New York Times Magazine, and Playboy (Nepal 1964–1966)

Literature and non-fiction 
 Mildred D. Taylor, African-American writer known for her works exploring the struggle faced by African-American families in the Deep South (Ethiopia 1965–1967)
 Kent Haruf, author of Plainsong, The Tie That Binds, Where You Once Belonged, Eventide, Benediction, Our Souls at Night  (Turkey] 1966–68)
 Paul Theroux, author of Mosquito Coast and Great Railway Bazaar (Malawi 1963–65)
 Roland Merullo, author of Leaving Losapas, In Revere, In Those Days, Breakfast with Buddha, (Micronesia 1979–1980)
Bob Shacochis, author of Easy in the Island, winner of the American Book Award (Eastern Caribbean 1975–76)
 Moritz Thomsen, author of Living Poor (Ecuador 1963–1965)
 Richard Wiley, author of Ahmed's Revenge and Soldiers in Hiding, winner of PEN/Faulkner Award (Korea 1967–69)
 Howard Ashman,  American playwright and lyricist (Burkina Faso ? – ?)
 George B. Hutchinson, Author of In Search of Nella Larsen (Burkina Faso 1975–1977)
 Charles Murray, American libertarian political scientist, author, and columnist. Well known for Losing Ground: American Social Policy 1950–1980 and his controversial book The Bell Curve (Thailand 1965–1968)
 John Perkins, author of Confessions of an Economic Hit Man (Ecuador 1968–1970)
 Mark T. Sullivan, author who writes mystery and suspense novels with James Patterson (Niger ?–?)
 Bruce Watson, author of Freedom Summer, Sacco and Vanzetti, and other books on American history. (Costa Rica 1985-87)
 Stefanie DeLeo (author, playwright), author of Worth a Thousand Words and Chicken Soup for the Soul (South Africa 2007-2009)

Art and architecture 

 Martin Puryear, sculptor (Sierra Leone 1964–1966)
 Wayne Chabre, sculptor (Lesotho 1969–1970)
 Jonathan Lemon, cartoonist (Honduras 2003-2005)
 Joel Shapiro, sculptor (India 1965–67)
 Roger K. Lewis, architect, professor of architecture, journalist (Tunisia 1964-1966)

Music 

 Kinky Friedman, Texas singer, songwriter, novelist, politician (Malaysia 1967–1969)
 Mary Kim Joh, Korean-American music composer, academic and medical research scientist. (Liberia 1977–78)

Television, film, theater, and radio 
 Chris Matthews, host of NBC's Hardball (Swaziland 1968–70)
 Bob Vila, host of television show This Old House (Panama 1971–73)
 Bob Beckel, political analyst, co-host of The Five (Philippines 1971–72)
 Taylor Hackford, movie producer of Ray, An Officer and a Gentleman and The Devil's Advocate (Bolivia 1968–69)
 Joanie Laurer (Chyna), American professional wrestler, glamour model, pornographic film actress, and bodybuilder. (Guatemala 1993–95)
 Richard Sanders, actor best known for playing Les Nessman on WKRP in Cincinnati (Brazil 1966–69)
 Marco Werman, host of Public Radio International's The World (Togo, 1984–87)
 Marissa Aroy, Filipino-American director and producer. She directed the documentaries Sikhs in America (Dominican Republic 1995–1997)
 Rajiv Joseph, American playwright and a 2010 Pulitzer Prize finalist (Senegal 1996–1998)
 Milt Kogan, actor (Upper Volta 1970–1972)
 Judith Dwan Hallet, documentary filmmaker (Tunisia 1964–1966)

Activism and aid 

 Ken Hackett, president, Catholic Relief Services and former United States Ambassador to the Holy See (Ghana 1968–1971)
 Sapreet Kaur, civil rights activist and executive director of the Sikh Coalition (Uganda, 1998–2001)
 Cindy Marano, economic justice and women's rights activist (Ecuador 1967–1969)
 Carl Pope, former Executive Director of the Sierra Club (India 1967 – 1969)
 Gregory Stanton, founder and president of Genocide Watch (Ivory Coast ?–?)

Government
 M. Peter McPherson, served as a special assistant to President Gerald Ford, administrator of USAID  (Peru 1965–1966)
 Timothy Kraft, retired political consultant; campaign manager in 1980 for U.S. President Jimmy Carter (Guatemala 1963-64)
 John T. Morton, Director of U.S. Immigration and Customs Enforcement (ICE) 2009–2013 (Chad ?–?)
 Peter Navarro, American heterodox economist, who previously served as the Assistant to the President, Director of Trade and Industrial Policy, and the Director of the White House National Trade Council during the Trump Administration (Thailand 1973–1976)
 Robert Pastor, member of the National Security Council (Malaysia 1970–72)

Elected office 

 Christopher Dodd, former U.S. Senator, Connecticut (Dominican Republic 1966–68)
 Jim Doyle, 44th Governor of Wisconsin and wife Jessica Doyle (Tunisia 1967–69)
 Steve Driehaus, former U.S. Representative from Ohio (Senegal 1988–1990)
 Sam Farr, former U.S. Representative from California (Colombia 1964–66)
 John Garamendi, State of California Insurance Commissioner, U.S. Representative from California (Ethiopia 1966–68)
 Tony P. Hall, former U.S. Representative from Ohio, former Ambassador to the FAO (Thailand 1966–67)
 Joseph P. Kennedy III, U.S. Representative from Massachusetts (Dominican Republic 2004–2006)
 Mike Honda, U.S. Representative from California (El Salvador 1965-1967)
 Thomas J. Murphy Jr., mayor of Pittsburgh, Pennsylvania (Paraguay 1970–72)
 Thomas Petri, former U.S. Representative from Wisconsin (Somalia 1966–67)
 Michael A. Rice, former Rhode Island State Representative (Philippines 1981–85)
 Christopher Shays, former U.S. Representative from Connecticut (Fiji 1968–70)
 Bob Taft, 67th Governor of Ohio (Tanzania 1963–65)
 Paul Tsongas former U.S. Senator, candidate for President in 1992 (Ethiopia 1962-64)
 James Walsh, former U.S. Representative from New York (Nepal 1970–72)
 Mike Ward, former U.S. Representative from Kentucky (The Gambia 1978–79)
 Paul B. Henry, former U.S. Representative from Michigan (Liberia and Ethiopia 1963–1965)
 Tom Wolf, 47th and current Governor of Pennsylvania, (India 1969-71)
 Jason Carter, candidate for Governor of Georgia in 2014 (South Africa 1997–99)
 Chris Beutler, Mayor of Lincoln, Nebraska  (Turkey 1966–1967)
 Jim Courter, former U.S. Representative from New Jersey (Venezuela 1967–1969)
 Kitty Piercy, Mayor of Eugene, Oregon (Ethiopia 1964–1966)
 Rodger Randle, former mayor of Tulsa, Oklahoma (Brazil 1962–1964)

Peace Corps Directors 

 Carol Spahn, 21st Director of The Peace Corps (Romania 1994-96)
 Jody Olsen, 20th Director of the Peace Corps
 Carrie Hessler-Radelet, 19th Director of the Peace Corps, (Western Samoa 1981–1984)
 Aaron S. Williams, 18th Director of the Peace Corps, (Dominican Republic, 1967–70)
 Ron Tschetter, 17th Director of The Peace Corps (India 1966–68)
 Mark Schneider, 15th Director of the Peace Corps, senior vice president of International Crisis Group (El Salvador 1966–68)
 Carol Bellamy, 13th Director of the Peace Corps, former head of UNESCO, president of World Learning (Guatemala 1963–1965)

Law 
 Drew S. Days III, served as United States Solicitor General from 1993 to 1996 under President Bill Clinton and first African American Assistant Attorney General for the Civil Rights Division in the Carter Administration from 1977 to 1980 (Honduras 1967–69)
 Daniel Foley, American retired attorney and judge. Judge of the Hawaii Intermediate Court of Appeals and Associate Justice of the Supreme Court of Palau.
 Jim Gray, American jurist and writer. Presiding judge of the Superior Court of Orange County, California and vice presidential nominee for the libertarian party in 2012 (Costa Rica 1966 – 1968.)
 Sarah Parker, Chief Justice of the North Carolina Supreme Court (Turkey 1964–1966)

Foreign service 

 Christopher R. Hill, American diplomat who served as the U.S. Ambassador to Iraq from 2009 to 2010 (Cameroon 1974–76)
 Vicki Huddleston, ambassador to Mali and Madagascar, Charge de affaires to Haiti and Ethiopia, and Principal Officer to the US Interests Section in Havana (Peru 1964–66)
 Darryl N. Johnson, ambassador to Thailand (Thailand 1962–65)
 Kathleen Stephens, ambassador to South Korea (South Korea, 1975–77)
 Victor L. Tomseth, ambassador to Laos and hostage in the Iran hostage crisis
 Richard Boucher, American diplomat who was Deputy Secretary-General of the Organisation for Economic Co-operation and Development (OECD) from 2009 until 2013 (Senegal, 1973–75)
 Robert Blackwill,  United States Ambassador to India, and United States National Security Council Deputy for Iraq  (Malawi 1964–66)
 Gina Abercrombie-Winstanley,  diplomat who served as U.S. Ambassador to Malta (Oman ? – ?)
 Charles C. Adams Jr., former United States Ambassador to Finland, (Kenya 1968–1970)
 Frank Almaguer, served as United States Ambassador to Honduras (Belize 1967–69)
 Michael R. Arietti,  United States ambassador to the nation of Rwanda (India ?–?)
 Michael Corbin, United States Ambassador to the United Arab Emirates (Mauritania 1982–84)
 Joseph R. Donovan Jr.,  diplomat and the current United States Ambassador to Indonesia (Korea ?–?)
 Laurence Foley, American diplomat who was assassinated outside his home in Amman, Jordan. 
 Gordon Gray III,  Minister-Counselor and former U.S. Ambassador to Tunisia (Morocco 1978–1980)
 Edmund Hull, United States Ambassador to Yemen (Tunisia, 1987–1990)
 John Limbert, former Deputy Assistant Secretary of State for Iran (Iran 1964–1966)
 Stephen Schwartz United States Ambassador to Somalia (Cameroon 1981–83)
 J. Christopher Stevens, former U.S. Ambassador to Libya (Morocco 1983–1985)
 Larry L. Palmer, U.S. Ambassador to Honduras (2002-2005) and U.S. Ambassador to Barbados and the Eastern Caribbean States (2012–16).

Education 

 James H. Fowler, American social scientist (Ecuador, 1992–1994)
 Victor H. Mair, American Sinologist and professor of Chinese at the University of Pennsylvania (Nepal 1965–1967)
 Suzanne Preston Blier, Allen Whitehill Clowes Professor of Fine Arts and of African and African American Studies, Harvard University (Benin 1969–71)
 Allan Gibbard, Richard B. Brandt Distinguished University Professor of Philosophy at the University of Michigan (Ghana 1963–65)
 Clark Gibson, Professor of Political Science, University of California, San Diego (Nepal)
Charles R. Larson, academic specializing in African literature (Nigeria, 1960–62)
 Roger K. Lewis, Professor Emeritus of Architecture, University of Maryland (Tunisia, 1964–66)
 William G. Moseley, Professor of Geography, Macalester College (Mali 1987–89)
 Joseph Opala, Historian at James Madison University, studied the "Sierra Leone-Gullah Connection" (Sierra Leone 1974–77)
 Michael A. Rice, professor, University of Rhode Island (Philippines 1981–1985)
Mavis Sanders, research scholar at Child Trends (Papua New Guinea 1987-1989)
 Donna Shalala, president of the University of Miami, former Secretary of Health and Human Services (Iran 1962–64)
 Michael J. Snarskis, archaeologist, University of Costa Rica (UCR)</ref> (Costa Rica 1967 – 1969)
 Robert H. Frank, professor of management and economics at Cornell University
 Dirk Ballendorf, Guamanian historian and professor of Micronesian studies (Philippines 1961–1963)
 Guy Consolmagno, American research astronomer, Jesuit religious brother, and Director of the Vatican Observatory. (Kenya 1983–1985)
 José Gómez, labor and civil rights activist and educator (Brazil 1968–1969)
 Bruce Cumings, American historian of East Asia (Korea 1967–68)
 John Haugeland, chair of the Chicago philosophy department (Tonga 1966–1968)
Joseph S. Murphy (1933-1998), university administrator
 R. David Zorc, American linguist (Philippines, 1965–69)

Science and medicine 
Kent V. Carey, drafted from Peace Corps 17months combat medic Viednam. Medical school, ER doctor retired
 Mae Jemison, American engineer, physician and NASA astronaut (Sierra Leone and Liberia 1983–85)
 Joseph M. Acaba, American educator, hydrogeologist, and NASA astronaut (Dominican Republic 1994–96) 
 Ina May Gaskin, Certified Professional Midwife, author, known as the "Mother of Modern Midwifery" (Malaysia 1963–65)
 Charles Snead Houston, high-altitude medical researcher and mountaineer (first Country Director, India 1962–65)
 Gene Carl Feldman, oceanographer at NASA Goddard Space Flight Center (Western Samoa 1974–1977)
 Carle M. Pieters, noted American planetary scientist (Malaysia 1967–1969)
 Lillian Carter nurse, mother of President Jimmy Carter (India 1966–68)

See also 
 National Peace Corps Association

References

External links 
 Official Peace Corps Web Site: Notable RPCVs
 Peace Corps Library: List of Notable RPCVs
Peace Corps Worldwide (retrieved February 25, 2021)

Peace Corps
Peace Corps